Dolan Levon Nichols (February 28, 1930 – November 28, 1989), nicknamed "Nick", was an American professional baseball player, a relief pitcher who worked in 24 games in the Major Leagues for the  Chicago Cubs.

Nichols' stint with the Cubs was largely spent during the early weeks of the 1958 campaign. He registered his four Major League decisions — all losses — between May 4 and June 7. Earlier, on April 23, he earned his only MLB save against the Los Angeles Dodgers, preserving a 7–6 win for Don Elston at the Los Angeles Memorial Coliseum. In 41⅓ MLB innings pitched, Nichols surrendered 46 hits and 16 bases on balls, with nine strikeouts.

Nichols' minor league career lasted nine seasons (1952–1960). He won 80 games, losing 67, for teams in the Cleveland Indians' and Cubs' organizations.

References

External links

1930 births
1989 deaths
Baseball players from Mississippi
Cedar Rapids Indians players
Chicago Cubs players
Fort Worth Cats players
Indianapolis Indians players
Little Rock Travelers players
Major League Baseball pitchers
Memphis Chickasaws players
Portland Beavers players
Reading Indians players
San Diego Padres (minor league) players
Spartanburg Peaches players
Tulsa Oilers (baseball) players
People from Tishomingo County, Mississippi